Lutz Neubert (born 23 December 1953) is a German lightweight rower. He won a gold medal at the 1976 World Rowing Championships in Villach with the lightweight men's eight.

References

1953 births
Living people
German male rowers
World Rowing Championships medalists for West Germany